Asca evansi is a species of mite in the family Ascidae.

References

Further reading

 

evansi
Articles created by Qbugbot
Animals described in 1969